A community fridge is a refrigerator (colloquially "fridge") located in a public space. Sometimes called freedges, they are a type of mutual aid project that enables food to be shared within a community. Some community fridges also have an associated area for non-perishable food. Unlike traditional food pantries, these grassroots projects encourage anyone to put food in and take food out without limit, helping to remove the stigma from its use. The fridges take a decentralized approach, often being maintained by a network of volunteers, community members, local businesses, and larger organizations. Food in community fridges is primarily donated by individuals or food rescue organizations and can be sourced from a variety of places. Major grocers like Trader Joe's and Whole Foods donate large amounts of excess foods to food rescue organizations that then donate to these fridges. The food donated would have otherwise been thrown out.

The main aim of community fridges is to reduce food insecurity, while also mitigating food waste. They enable people facing hardship to have easy access to fresh, nutritious food. Fridges offer a wide range of food from canned goods to fresh produce to pre-cooked meals. Pre-cooked meals are required to be labeled when donated. Many fridges also accept household items, sanitary goods, and during the COVID-19 pandemic, offered masks and other PPE.  Community fridges can also serve as social spaces that enable people to connect to their communities; Shelterforce magazine notes that "community fridges seem to have discovered a sweet spot in service delivery: close enough to feel the warmth of shared humanity, but far enough to avoid a sense of resentment or burden." Many fridges also painted by from local artists.

History 

The first community fridges were set up in Germany, by a group called Foodsharing. The next community fridge was started in Spain in 2015. Community fridges draw inspiration from food initiatives such as the 1960s Black Panther Free Breakfast program, which was the first free breakfast program for students in the US and inspired the USDA's school breakfast program.

In the UK, early community fridges were set up at Frome, South Derbyshire, Brixton (London), and Botley (Oxford). A national network of community fridges was set up in July 2017 by the environmental charity Hubbub UK, which offers a free support service to new projects.

Community fridges are a rapidly-growing phenomenon, with fridges also recently set up in New Zealand, India, Israel, the Netherlands, and Canada (Community Fridges Toronto has seven fridges).

COVID-19 pandemic 

Community fridges have recently made a wide emergence in the U.S. during the COVID-19 pandemic. During the COVID-19 pandemic, community fridges were developed in response to a significant increase in food insecurity. In New York City, community fridges, nicknamed “Friendly Fridges,” were introduced in February 2020, the first one placed by an activist group, In Our Hearts. In Our Hearts has now set up at least 14 of the 70 fridges around New York City. In Philadelphia, Dr. Michelle Nelson launched a Mama-Tee Community Fridge in North Philly, now there are 18 of them.

Using New York City as a model, community fridges have popped up in cities across the U.S. including Los Angeles, Philadelphia, Chicago, Atlanta, and more. As of September 2021, Los Angeles County has 14 community fridges.  In Chicago, as of September 2021, there are 26 community fridges providing support to the community.  The Love Fridge is a mutual aid network placing community refrigerators across the city.  In Atlanta, Georgia, Latisha Springer, started Free99Fridge, a grassroots organization providing food to communities through their community fridge network.  The organization maintains five community fridges throughout the metro Atlanta area.

In the Greater Boston Area, the first community fridge was started in Jamaica Plain in September 2020. Soon after, another fridge emerged in the neighborhood of Dorchester, Boston's largest neighborhood. As of September 2021, fridges in the neighborhoods of Allston, Fenway, Mattapan, and Roslindale have emerged, as well as in the cities of Somerville, Cambridge, Worcester. 

In Thailand, entrepreneur Supakit Kulchartvijit's Pantry of Sharing pantry cabinets, a variation on the community fridges, was launched in May 2020 in Bangkok and Rayong. Thailand's SCG Foundation emulated Kulchartvijit's initiative, putting up a total 60 pantry cabinets in the country by 25 May 2020. 

The following year in the Philippines as the pandemic dragged on, a trend utilizing a similar concept emerged across the country. Small carts carrying essential items were parked along sidewalks for locals to obtain any of the items without charge. The first such cart to be reported was started by the Members Church of God International on March 14, 2021.

Also in the Philippines, a similar idea under the term "community pantry" was started on Maginhawa Street in the Teacher's Village neighborhood of Quezon City on April 14, 2021. This initiative gained a wider media coverage than the MCGI initiative, resulting in the mushrooming of hundreds of similar initiatives throughout the country. In about a week after the Maginhawa pantry's launch, more than 100 pantries were set up in various locations; a week thereafter more than 300 pantries had already been set up.

Following the Maginhawa movement's example in the Philippines, various community pantries were set up in East Timor.

Challenges 
Challenges surrounding community fridges include maintaining cleanliness, ensuring food safety, and making sure that mutual aid model of community fridges is not abused (e.g. that nobody profits from the food). In the UK, setting up a community fridge requires a rota of volunteers to clean the fridge and check the food; public liability insurance; the support of the local authority environmental health officer; and, evidently, a fridge and associated waste bins. Several community fridges in Germany were threatened with closure due to health concerns.

Community fridges are sometimes criticized for not providing a systemic solution to food insecurity. Fridges are needed by those who are actively hungry or do not have the means to access nutritious food, but do not address underlying causes of food insecurity.

Fridges are also occasionally criticized for not addressing the needs of a community. Often, food provided to the fridge does not meet the cultural and nutrition needs of the community. In addition, there is often controversy surrounding the legality of community fridges. Policies addressing maintaining a community fridge vary widely from community to community. Fridges must be placed on private property, which makes them dependent on the owners willingness to participate. In Boston's Allston Neighborhood, the Allston community fridge was forced to move because new property owners were no longer willing to house them.

See also 
 Little Free Pantries and Blessing Boxes
 Free Blockbuster

References

External links
A Washington Post feature on free fridges in Philadelphia

Charity
Food waste
Private aid programs
Sharing economy
Refrigerators